Morgan Lauré Garrett (born September 4, 1985) is an American voice actress affiliated with Funimation, Studiopolis and Bang Zoom!. She won the Behind the Voice Actors' Breakthrough Voice Actor of the Year Award in 2012. 
Her major roles include Seraphim in the Is This a Zombie? series, Kaori Kanzaki in the A Certain Magical Index series, Twoearle in Gonna be the Twin-Tail!!, Rico Brzenska in the Attack on Titan series, Akira Mado in the Tokyo Ghoul series and Tina in the Toriko series.

Filmography

Anime

Films

Video games

Awards

References

External links
 
 
 

Living people
1985 births
Actresses from Dallas
American video game actresses
American voice actresses
American stage actresses
21st-century American actresses
Texas A&M University–Commerce alumni
Southern Methodist University alumni